André Poggenburg (born 1975 in Weißenfels, Bezirk Halle, East Germany) is a German politician and former member of the Alternative for Germany (AfD) party. He was state chairman of the party in the federal state of Saxony-Anhalt and was leading candidate for the 2016 Saxony-Anhalt state elections. The AfD gained 24.2 percent of the votes and is now the second largest political force in Saxony-Anhalt. After a 2017 leak of his WhatsApp chat, Poggenburg was found to be using the neo-Nazi slogan, "Germany for the Germans". In 2018 he was forced to resign after referring to Germans of Turkish origin as "fatherless vermin" and "camel drivers", who should go back to their "mud huts" and "multiple wives". In spite of this, he remained a member of the AfD federal board until January 2019.

Biography 
Poggenburg described himself as a "national conservative". He worked as a merchant and equipment manufacturer. He led a company together with his stepfather and founded his own business organization for manufacturing machines in Stößen in 1996. He managed a repair company for car radiators, which moved to Gut Nöbeditz in 2008 and ceased operations on New Year's Eve 2015. Poggenburg is unmarried.

There were reports about financial problems of Poggenburg before the elections. According to Poggenburg, these reports were "strongly exaggerated".

He was highly criticised in the social and broadcast media for prematurely blaming Merkel's open refugee policy for the 2016 Munich shooting. The shooter's motive was ultimately ascertained as enacting revenge on his classmates for bullying.

Poggenburg resigned as regional party leader for AfD in 2018 after labeling Turks as "camel drivers" and immigrants with dual nationality a 
"homeless mob we no longer want to have." He left the party in January 2019 to form his own far-right party, Aufbruch der deutschen Patrioten ("Awakening of German Patriots", AdP), but the party immediately came under criticism when it announced that it would use a logo which included a blue cornflower, a symbol associated with the anti-Semitic Schoenerer Movement which was also used by banned Austrian Nazis in the 1930s before the Anschluss in 1938 united Austria with Nazi Germany.  Poggenburg has been criticized in the past for his use of vocabulary redolent of Nazi-era Germany.
In August 2019 Poggenburg left his party creation AdP after he lost an infighting about the question of supporting the AfD in the upcoming state elections of fall 2019 in Saxony and Brandenburg.

References

1975 births
Living people
People from Weißenfels
People from Bezirk Halle
Members of the Landtag of Saxony-Anhalt